Valley Park High School is a public high school in Valley Park, Missouri, United States serving both Valley Park and The Village of Twin Oaks.

History
Valley Park High School opened on September 6, 1932 and graduated its first class in 1934. Since then, Valley Park has remained the only public high school in the area

Academics
The average ACT is 20.6. There are approximately 21 teachers giving the school a student-teacher ratio of 13:1. 95% of students graduate on time and 78% go to college. Valley Park High is ranked 15th in Missouri in education. VPH has won several awards for academic achievement such as:
2012 National Blue Ribbon School Award
2012 Missouri Gold Star School

Demographics
The Demographics of the high school in the 2016–2017 school year was as follows:

References

High schools in St. Louis County, Missouri
Public high schools in Missouri
Buildings and structures in St. Louis County, Missouri
School buildings completed in 1932
1932 establishments in Missouri